Stade de la Maladière is a multi-purpose stadium in Neuchâtel, Switzerland.  It is currently used mostly for football matches and is the home ground of Neuchâtel Xamax.  The stadium holds 12,000.  It replaced the old Stade de la Maladière.

History
The stadium opened in February 2007, with Neuchatel Xamax defeating La Chaux-de-Fonds by a scoreline of 3–2 in front of a sell-out crowd of 12,000 people. The stadium complex was officially inaugurated in June 2007. The complex includes a shopping mall underneath the stadium, a fire house, and six gymnasiums. A small piece of the roof fell off in July 2007.

The stadium has used a synthetic turf since its opening. The turf was replaced in 2015.

Portugal used the stadium as a training base for Euro 2008.

The European Rugby headquarters moved to the stadium site in 2014.

References

Maladiere
Neuchâtel
Multi-purpose stadiums in Switzerland
Buildings and structures in the canton of Neuchâtel
Sport in Neuchâtel
2007 establishments in Switzerland
Sports venues completed in 2007
21st-century architecture in Switzerland